John Barresi (born June 1, 1975) is an American sport kite flier, kite designer, editor and owner of KiteLife magazine and KiteLife.com since 2002, leader of Team KiteLife performance team, and owner of Kite Forge design company.

Career 
One of the most prolific currently active sport kite fliers in the world, Barresi started in the kiting community as an enthusiast in August 1990. He started at a competitive level in 1991 and has since secured top rankings in a variety of sport kite disciplines (individual, pairs, team, dual line, quad line, indoor) in international competitions and in demonstrations as an invited performer. He has served several roles at kiting organizations including President of the American Kitefliers Association, board member of Kite Trade Association International, and as a judge at competitions held around the globe.

In 2003, Baressi became the sole owner of KiteLife Magazine. The magazine continued in circulation through 2014, the website remains active with discussion boards, prize drawings, and live chat.

Attending the 2006 World Sport Kite Championships in Berck sur Mer France as a judge, he participated in organized quad line team flying for the first time and impassioned by his experiences there, formed Team iQuad with friend David Hathaway immediately upon returning to the United States. The team quickly gained popularity and by 2008 was invited to events around the world. Team iQuad would go on to win industry awards for promoting the sport globally. Over the seven years the team performed, they included at least 16 regular members with additional guest stars and fill-in performers. The group disbanded in September 2013 with their final performance at the Antelope Island Stampede Festival.

In 2008, Barresi was the youngest recipient of the American Kitefliers Association Lifetime Achievement Award.

In 2016, Barresi formed a new team called Team KiteLife or TKL, with additional founding members Scott Benz, Brett Marchel, and Eli Russell. Pilots added to the team include Jeremy Wharton (2019), Sara Russell (2020), Sari Becker (2020), and Jim Doman (2022). The team has flown at events across the United States and Europe.

In 2017, Barresi launched a company called Kite Forge, initially featuring a single dual line kite with promises to expand to new kites in the future. The company has expanded to sell multiple kite designs, kite parts, and kite apparel.

On August 23, 2019 at the Washington State International Kite Festival, he led a world record group of 101 quad line kites in team formation as the team captain, beating his own previous records of 81 quad line kites in team formation set in 2013 and another of 64 set in 2010.

Barresi's award-winning kite designs include the Djinn, the Revolution B-Series, the Kymera, and the Kaiju.

National Competitions 

Teams in 1993, 1995, and 1997 represented the US in the bi-annual Sport Team and Competitive Kiting (STACK) World Championships.

Kite designs 
In 2007 Barresi partnered with Revolution Kites to design the Revolution B-Series, a "signature series" quad line kite. The kite won many awards and quickly became the standard for quad line kite pilots around the globe. The model was discontinued on January 1, 2017.

In June 2011 working with Into The Wind, Barresi released the Kymera, a dual line stunt kite. The model was discontinued in 2018.

In September 2017, Barresi announced his founding a kite company Kite Forge and its inaugural kite, the Kaiju, a dual line kite for indoor flight and light outdoor winds. The Kaiju won Kite Addict Magazine's "most versatile 2 line kite" award for 2018 and Kite Forge was runner up for the kite manufacturer of the year.

In August 2018, Barresi announced the Djinn, a quad line kite. The initial design had three models, the Standard (ST), Mid Vent (MV), and Full Vent (VT) for various wind conditions. Despite a short time on the market the kite received many votes in the 2018 Kite Addict survey for best 4 line kite of the year, and runner up as New Kite of the Year. The design won the 2019 Kite Addict New Kite of the Year award. The Extreme Vent (XV) and Hardcore Vent (HV) models targeting high wind conditions were added in August 2019, and the Ultralight (UL) model for light wind was added in December 2021.  An indoor model, the Djinndoor, was added in October 2022.

References

Living people
American kite fliers
1975 births